Edward Kelaart may refer to:

 Ed Kelaart (1900–1989), Ceylonese cricketer
 Edward Frederick Kelaart (1819–1860), Ceylonese-born physician and naturalist